Holby City is a British medical drama television series that was broadcast on BBC One in the United Kingdom between 12 January 1999 and 29 March 2022. The series was created by Tony McHale and Mal Young as a spin-off from the BBC medical drama Casualty, which is set in the emergency department of the fictional Holby City Hospital, based in the equally fictitious town of Holby. Young wanted to explore what happened to patients treated in Casualty once they were taken away to the hospital's surgical wards. He opined that Casualty limited itself to "accident of the week" storylines, while Holby City allowed the possibility of storylines about long-term care, rather than immediate life-and-death decisions.

Holby City has earned various awards and nominations, with the nominations in categories ranging from Best Drama to its writing and editing work to the cast's acting performance. It received nominations for eight awards from the British Academy of Film and Television Arts (BAFTAs), winning the Best Continuing Drama in the 2008 British Academy Television Awards — an award for which it was unsuccessfully nominated in for three years prior to winning and five years after winning. Despite being the most shortlisted Holby City actress, Amanda Mealing (who portrayed Connie Beauchamp) did not win any awards for her role. Jimmy Akingbola was the most acclaimed actor from the series, winning two awards for his role as Antoine Malick. Rebecca Wojciechowski and Peter Mattessi are the only members of the show's production team to win an accolade; they have each won a Writers' Guild of Great Britain award. The serial has also been nominated for 32 awards at the National Television Awards, although it has never won.

Awards and nominations

BBC Drama Awards 

The BBC Drama Awards were an online award ceremony organised by BBC Online and voted by BBC Online users to celebrate a year in BBC television and media. Holby City has received 36 nominations from the awards.

British Academy Television Awards 
Established in 1955, the British Academy Television Awards (BAFTAs) were created by the charity British Academy of Film and Television Arts to recognise accomplishments in television. Holby City has received one award from eight nominations.

Broadcast Awards 
The Broadcast Awards, which were created by Broadcast magazine, honour accomplishments in the UK television programming industry. Holby City has received 11 nominations.

Digital Spy Soap Awards 
The Digital Spy Soap Awards, which were created by entertainment website Digital Spy, annually celebrates moments in British and Australian soap operas. Originally conceived as an award ceremony in 2008, the awards later became an online voting system across the website as part of the Digital Spy Reader Awards. Holby City has received 16 nominations.

Ethnic Multicultural Media Awards 
The Ethnic Multicultural Media Awards (EMMAs) were created to promote diversity within the media industry by recognising accomplishments in the multicultural community. Holby City has received two awards from four nominations.

Inside Soap Awards 
The Inside Soap Awards are presented annually by Inside Soap magazine and acknowledge achievements in British and Australian soap operas. Holby City has received four awards from 47 nominations.

Music Video and Screen Awards 
Recognising the talent and achievement of ethnic minorities, the Music Video and Screen Awards have been presented annually at the Birmingham Black International Film Festival since 2007. Holby City has won three awards from three nominations.

National Television Awards 
Introduced in 1995, the National Television Awards are designed to award achievements within British television. Holby City has received 32 nominations.

Royal Television Society Awards 
Organised by the Royal Television Society, the Royal Television Society Awards are presented annually and award based on achievements in television programming and programme production amongst others. Holby City has received four nominations.

Screen Nation Film and Television Awards 

The Screen Nation Film and Television Awards are presented annually and were designed as a platform to raise the profile of black British and international film and television talent of African heritage. Holby City has received five awards from 26 nominations.

TV Choice Awards 

The TV Choice Awards are presented annually by TV Choice magazine and are voted for by the public. Holby City has received 34 nominations.

Writers' Guild of Great Britain Awards 
Recognising accomplishments in television writing, the Writers' Guild of Great Britain Awards have been presented annually by the Writers' Guild of Great Britain since 1961. Holby City has won two award from seven nominations.

Other

References

External links 
 Awards for Holby City at the Internet Movie Database

Holby
Holby City
Awards and nominations received by Holby